Joseon Sanggosa (literally Ancient history of Korea) is a book written in 1931 by Shin Chaeho, and which describes the ancient history of Korea. It covers the history of Korea from Gojoseon to the destruction of Baekje. It was published serially in the Korean newspaper Chosun Ilbo from 1931. It was finally published as a separate volume in 1948. The Joseon Sangosa consists of eleven chapters.

See also
History of Korea
List of books about Korea
  Joseon Sanggosa of wikisource

History books about Korea
1931 non-fiction books
Shin Chaeho